Tazehabad (also Romanized as Tāzehābād; also known as Tāzehābād-e Cherāghābād) is a village in Sis Rural District, Bolbanabad District, Dehgolan County, Kurdistan Province, Iran. At the 2006 census, its population was 370, in 87 families. The village is populated by Kurds.

References 

Towns and villages in Dehgolan County
Kurdish settlements in Kurdistan Province